Seda Aslanyürek Tokatlıoğlu (born 25 June 1986) is a Turkish volleyball player. She is 192 cm tall and plays as an outside spiker. However, she played as an opposite both in Turkey women's national volleyball team and Beijing from China. Tokatlıoğlu has a block height of 304 cm and spike height of 312 cm and played more than 200 times for the national team. She studied at Gazi University.

Career
Tokatlıoğlu was born in Ankara. She has been playing for Fenerbahçe since 2005 with jersey number 9. She is also the team's captain. Before signing for Fenerbahçe, she played for İller Bankası from 2002 to 2005.

With Fenerbahçe, she won the silver medal at 2009-10 CEV Champions League and the bronze medal at the 2008–09 CEV Cup and was awarded "Best Scorer".

Seda won the bronze medal at the 2010–11 CEV Champions League with Fenerbahçe.

Tokatlıoğlu played with Fenerbahçe in the 2012 FIVB Club World Championship held in Doha, Qatar and helped her team to win the bronze medal after defeating Puerto Rico's Lancheras de Cataño 3–0.

On 27 July 2014 she signed with Beijing from China.

Adam Voleybol Spor(2021-2022
  İller Bankası (2002-2005)
  Fenerbahçe (2005-2014)
  Beijing (2014-2015)
  Galatasaray (2016-2018)

Awards

Individuals
 2008 World Grand Prix "Best Scorer"
 2008-09 Aroma Women's Volleyball League play-offs "Most Valuable Player"
 2008–09 CEV Cup "Best Scorer"

National team
 2003 European Championship -  Silver Medal
 2005 Mediterranean Games -  Gold Medal
 2009 Mediterranean Games -  Silver Medal
 2009 European League -  Silver Medal
 2013 Mediterranean Games -

Clubs
 2007-08 Aroma Women's Volleyball League -  Runner-Up, with Fenerbahçe Acıbadem
 2008-09 Women's CEV Top Teams Cup -  3rd place and best scorer with Fenerbahçe Acıbadem
 2008-09 Aroma Women's Volleyball League -  Champion, with Fenerbahçe Acıbadem
 2008-09 Turkish Cup -  Runner-Up, with Fenerbahçe Acıbadem
 2009 Turkish Super Cup -  Champion, with Fenerbahçe Acıbadem
 2009-10 Aroma Women's Volleyball League -  Champion, with Fenerbahçe Acıbadem
 2009-10 Turkish Cup -  Champion, with Fenerbahçe Acıbadem
 2010 Turkish Super Cup -  Champion, with Fenerbahçe Acıbadem
 2009-10 CEV Champions League -  Runner-Up, with Fenerbahçe Acıbadem
 2010 FIVB World Club Championship -  Champion, with Fenerbahçe Acıbadem
 2010-11 CEV Champions League -  Bronze medal, with Fenerbahçe Acıbadem
 2010-11 Aroma Women's Volleyball League -  Champion, with Fenerbahçe Acıbadem
 2011-12 CEV Champions League -  Champion, with Fenerbahçe Universal
 2012 FIVB Women's Club World Championship –  Bronze Medal, with Fenerbahçe
 2012-13 CEV Cup -  Runner-Up, with Fenerbahçe
 2013-14 CEV Cup -  Champion, with Fenerbahçe

See also
 Turkish women in sports

References

External links
 
 

1986 births
Living people
Sportspeople from Ankara
Turkish women's volleyball players
Fenerbahçe volleyballers
İller Bankası volleyballers
Gazi University alumni
Volleyball players at the 2015 European Games
European Games competitors for Turkey
Mediterranean Games medalists in volleyball
Mediterranean Games gold medalists for Turkey
Mediterranean Games silver medalists for Turkey
Competitors at the 2005 Mediterranean Games
Competitors at the 2009 Mediterranean Games
Competitors at the 2013 Mediterranean Games
Galatasaray S.K. (women's volleyball) players
20th-century Turkish sportswomen
21st-century Turkish sportswomen